A Roman Scandal is a 1919 American short silent comedy film starring Colleen Moore, and directed by Al Christie.

Plot
Mary is stage struck and will not marry until she makes it in show business. Her fiance is distraught that they might never marry. The actors of the local stage company go on strike, leaving management with nobody to fill all the roles. Mary volunteers herself and her fiance, and in the confusion of the production, chaos follows. In the end, Mary abandons her dreams for domestic bliss.

Cast
Colleen Moore as Mary
Earle Rodney as Jack
Eddie Barry
Billy Bletcher
Helen Darling
Jack Henderson
Gino Corrado (credited as Eugene Corey)

Background
Moore went to work with Al Christie to develop her comedy skills. Prior to her work with Christie, she was strictly a dramatic actress. In her autobiography Silent Star, she said she had read a quote that the greatest dramatic actresses had gotten their starts in comedy.

The film, a two-reel short, played with several other longer features at the various other venues where it was exhibited, such as with Anne of Green Gables, a Mary Miles Minter film, and with Cosmo Hamilton's The Miracle of Love at the Rivoli Rialto Theater in New York.

Footnotes

Bibliography
Jeff Codori (2012), Colleen Moore; A Biography of the Silent Film Star, McFarland Publishing,(Print , EBook ).

External links

 

1919 films
1919 comedy films
Silent American comedy films
American silent short films
American black-and-white films
Films directed by Al Christie
1919 short films
American comedy short films
1910s American films